Strife with Father is a Warner Bros.Merrie Melodies animated film directed by Robert McKimson and starring voice actor Mel Blanc. It was produced in 1948 and released in 1950. This is the fourth and final cartoon to feature Beaky Buzzard.

Plot

A buzzard egg is mysteriously delivered to two sparrows, Gwendolyn and Monte (parodies of actors Ronald Colman and his wife Benita Hume).  The "upper crusty" and very proper English Sparrows are not accustomed to having a repulsively ugly (and incredibly stupid) little bird about, but Gwendolyn convinces her husband that the baby bird will grow into a "beautiful swan". Unfortunately, as the narrator tells us, the little ugly bird grows into a very large ugly bird. Monte cannot even stand hearing the name of their "progeny", particularly when eating. But nonetheless, he takes Beaky out into the world to demonstrate the art of hunting for prey, such as barnyard fowl. Of course Beaky, being incredibly shy and inept, repeatedly causes many grievous injuries to Monte, and it is all Monte can do to salvage what little self-respect remains.

Home media
Strife with Father is available restored with its original titles on Looney Tunes Platinum Collection: Volume 2.

References

External links

1950 animated films
1950 short films
1950 films
Merrie Melodies short films
Films directed by Robert McKimson
Beaky Buzzard films
1950s Warner Bros. animated short films
Films scored by Carl Stalling
1950s English-language films